Trifolium glomeratum is a species of clover known by the common names clustered clover and bush clover. It is native to Eurasia and North Africa and it is known elsewhere as an introduced species. It easily takes hold in disturbed areas, becoming a common weed. It is an annual herb growing decumbent to upright in form with mostly hairless herbage. The leaves are made up of oval leaflets up to 1.2 centimeters in length. The inflorescences occur in leaf axils, each a headlike cluster of many flowers. Each flower has a calyx of sepals with triangular points that bend outward, and a pink corolla.

References

External links

Calflora Database: Trifolium glomeratum (Clustered clover) — introduced/invasive species.
UC CalPhotos gallery

glomeratum
Flora of Western Asia
Flora of North Africa
Flora of Syria
Plants described in 1753
Taxa named by Carl Linnaeus